In weight training, training to failure is repeating an exercise (such as the bench press) to the point of momentary muscular failure, i.e. the point where the neuromuscular system can no longer produce adequate force to overcome a specific workload. Two systematic reviews published in 2021 found no benefit to training to failure on hypertrophy, while one of the reviews found some evidence that not-to-failure training is superior for strength.

Initial failure

When the athlete has reached initial failure (i.e. fails to perform a further repetition), rather than ending the current set, the exercise can be continued by making the exercise easier (switching to another similar exercise e.g. pull-ups to chin-ups, switching to another (correct) form of the same exercise, switching to lower weight) or by recruiting help (from a spotting partner or by involving another body part). The athlete may also choose to use the rest-pause method or other advanced techniques.

Repetition maximum 

Determining a repetition maximum (RM; such as 1RM) must be done to true failure, so this also can be considered a form of training to failure. Though 1RM is the most popular and commonly used, any number of repetitions can be used, for instance a 10RM or 15RM. A 10RM weight is more useful in terms of training for hypertrophy than a 1RM. There is less consensus as to why a 10RM is actually safer; it may be because a 10RM can be performed with a much lower risk of joint injury (due to the lower weight), but also potentially because failure occurs due to absolute inability of the muscles to perform at the attempted weight (rather than due to fatigue). A 10RM would be the weight at which a person can do 10 repetitions, but fail to fully perform the 11th.

Types of failure 

There are multiple types of failure that can be reached before ending a set. They are listed here in order of increasing intensity.

 Pre-failure: The set is ended just before failure, as judged based on sensory feedback from the muscles and joints (proprioception).
 Tempo failure: The tempo or cadence used for the initial few repetitions can no longer be maintained. Additional repetitions cannot be performed at the same tempo.
 Form failure: Proper form or technique for repetitions can no longer be maintained. Additional repetitions cannot be performed using proper form.

When determining repetition maximum, form failure should be used. Training past form failure can cause joint and muscle injury and should never be attempted. Beginners should train to pre-failure or tempo failure, while focusing on maintaining proper form.

References 

Weight training